Geopolitique 1990 is a 1983 video game published by Strategic Simulations.

Gameplay
Geopolitique 1990 is a game in which the player controls the United States against the USSR played by the computer.

Reception
Bob Proctor reviewed the game for Computer Gaming World, and stated that "Geopolitique 1990 is not only an excellent game, it is an innovative one. It would be nice if it were more detailed (less abstract), it would be nice if you could play either side, it would be VERY nice if there were a two-player version. But I'm not finding fault with what is there; just wishfully thinking of what I'd like to see added to an already full disk."

Reviews
Computer Gaming World - Jun, 1992

References

External links
Review in Softline 
Review in Softalk
Review in Commodore Power/Play
Review in Family Computing
Review in Happy Computer (German)
Review in Washington Apple Pi
Review in "Run" (German)
Article in Tilt (French)

1983 video games
Apple II games
Cold War video games
Commodore 64 games
Government simulation video games
Strategic Simulations games
Turn-based strategy video games
Video games developed in the United States
Video games set in 1990
Video games set in the United States